Reeder may refer to:

 Reeder (surname)

Places
 Reeder Township, Anderson County, Kansas
 Reeder Township, Missaukee County, Michigan
 Reeder, North Dakota
 Reeder, Manitoba

See also 
 Reader (disambiguation)